La Paz (Spanish: "the peace") is a waterfall in central Costa Rica. In Spanish, it is known as Catarata de La Paz.

The waterfall is located immediately alongside Route 126. The River La Paz forms the waterfall after traversing  of volcanic terrain, and then continues through the rainforest of the eastern side of Poás Volcano. A short path leads behind the waterfall, where a small shrine had been located. Upstream from the waterfall is La Paz Waterfall Gardens, a hotel and park, where visitors can observe many different species of local wildlife.

The waterfall and surrounding area were severely damaged in the 6.1 magnitude earthquake of January 8, 2009. Landslides damaged the road that runs alongside the waterfall, but has since been fixed and offers a roadside stop for photos and souvenirs that may be considered great.

References

Waterfalls of Costa Rica
Geography of Alajuela Province
Tourist attractions in Alajuela Province